Daishowa-Marubeni International Ltd v Canada is a significant case of the Supreme Court of Canada concerning the application of Canadian income tax law, as well as the purposive interpretation of statutes.

Background
Daishowa‑Marubeni International Ltd., a company owned by Daishowa Paper Manufacturing and Marubeni Corporation, operated pulp mills in Peace River, Alberta and in Quesnel, British Columbia. Through separate subsidiaries in High Level, Alberta ("High Level") and Red Earth Creek, Alberta ("Brewster"), it carried on the business of harvesting logs and manufacturing finished timber. At the beginning of 1999, the subsidiaries were amalgamated into the parent company.

High Level was sold later in 1999 to Tolko Industries Ltd., and Brewster in 2000 to Seehta Forest Products. Both transactions included the sale of timber licences, each of which is considered to be a "timber resource property" under the Income Tax Act (Canada). Under Alberta law, consent was granted for the transfer of such licences subject to the condition that the purchaser assume all obligations relating to the reforestation of the land covered by the licence.

In filing its 1999 and 2000 tax returns Daishowa did not include the amounts relating to the assumption of such liabilities as part of the proceeds of disposition relating to the sale of such properties. The Minister of National Revenue asserted that it should have been part of such amount, relying on the definition set out in the Act at s. 248(1):

The Minister accordingly reassessed, adding into the proceeds of disposition $11,000,000 in respect of High Level and $2,966,301 in respect of Brewster, based on the estimated cost in DMI's accounting records, and accordingly adjusted Daishowa's taxable income for the years in question. Daishowa appealed the reassessment to the Tax Court of Canada, contending that the fair market value of those liabilities was not determinable at the time of closing and thus should not be included.

The courts below

At the TCC, Miller J allowed DMI's appeal of the Minister's reassessment in part. He agreed with the Minister, observing:

However, he held that it was not appropriate to add the entire estimated cost of the obligations to the proceeds, preferring to restrict the amount added back to the estimated cost that would take place within the 12 months following each sale, plus 20 percent of the estimated cost of the activities that would take place thereafter.

The Federal Court of Appeal dismissed Daishowa's appeal, allowed the Minister's cross-appeal and set aside the Judge's decision. In his ruling, Nadon JA (as he then was) agreed with Miller J as to the whether assumption of liabilities formed part of consideration, but held that there was no basis for reducing the value in question:

Mainville JA dissented, arguing that the reforestation obligations depressed the value of the timber resource properties, and thus resulted in a lower purchase price than would otherwise have been obtained for the sale.

Daishowa appealed the FCA ruling to the Supreme Court of Canada.

At the SCC

Appeal was allowed, and the matter was returned to the Minister for appropriate reassessment. In a unanimous ruling, Rothstein J dealt with two issues:

Are the reforestation liabilities to be included in the proceeds of disposition because the vendor is relieved of a liability or are they integral to and run with the forest tenures?
Does it make any difference that the parties agreed to a specific amount of the future reforestation liability?

On the first issue, he held:

 Mainville J was correct in stating that the obligations  much like needed repairs to property  are a future cost embedded in the forest tenure that serves to depress the tenure's value at the time of sale.
 as the cost of reforestation is not a distinct existing liability of the vendor, the assumption of such cost is thus excluded from proceeds of disposition independent of whether the cost is absolute or contingent.
 the Minister's approach, which would have resulted in different values for the vendor's proceeds of disposition and the purchaser's adjusted cost base, is thus avoided, as "an interpretation of the Act that promotes symmetry and fairness through a harmonious taxation scheme is to be preferred over an interpretation which promotes neither value."

On the second issue:

 the Minister and the lower courts were mistaken in relying on the company's accounting estimates as a basis for their reasoning
 any amount that the parties assigned to the reforestation obligations in the sale agreement was simply a factor in determining the fair market value of the forest tenures
 It is also irrelevant that Daishowa estimated the cost of future reforestation to compute its income for accounting purposes, as financial accounting and income tax calculation serve distinct purposes

Impact

In Daishowa, the SCC made a distinction between obligations that do not affect the value of assets (such as mortgages) and those that affect the value of property (such as the need for repairs). The assumption of the former would be included in the proceeds of disposition, while assumption of the latter would reduce the value (and therefore the purchase price) of the property. This suggests that the distinction can be made based on whether a liability can be described as being embedded in a specific property right or not, which causes the following questions to arise:

 would pension deficits or post-retirement benefit obligations affect the value of property rights such as workforce in place or goodwill?
 should an agreed estimate of such liabilities be included in proceeds of disposition to the vendor?
 should the assumption of such obligations be reflected as an addition to the cost of assets acquired by the purchaser, and does such an addition occur at the time of acquisition or when such expenses are actually incurred?

During the SCC's hearing of the case, the Canadian Association of Petroleum Producers, acting as an intervener, submitted that statutory obligations to reclaim mined land may be so physically connected to the process of mining itself that the obligations cannot be separated from the property right. Rothstein J declared in obiter:

While of considerable economic significance to Canadian resource industries, and praised by observers as reflecting commercial common sense, Daishowa also has great importance in assessing the SCC's "modern" approach to statutory interpretation. Although not as extensive in its use of the purposive approach as it was in Rizzo Shoes  or in its earlier case of Stubart Investments Ltd. v. The Queen, it did employ a more restrained approach as seen in Copthorne Holdings Ltd. v. Canada where Rothstein J (in his decision there) observed that interpretation should not be based on  "a value judgment of what is right or wrong nor with theories about what tax law ought to be or ought to do."

Further reading
 
  (comment on FCA decision)

References

Supreme Court of Canada cases
Taxation in Canada
2013 in Canadian case law
Taxation case law
Marubeni
Nippon Paper Industries